Scar on the Praeter or  is a Japanese anime television series produced by GoHands based on the Project Scard media project by Frontier Works. The series aired from January 9 to April 3, 2021 on the Animeism programming block.

Characters

Production and release
On September 6, 2020, the anime original television series was announced by Frontier Works. The series is animated by GoHands, using Unreal Engine 4 for the backgrounds, and directed by Shingo Suzuki. Suzuki will also design the characters. Tamazō Yanagi is handling series composition, and Conisch and Goon Trax are composing the series' music. It aired from January 9 to April 3, 2021 on the Animeism programming block on MBS, TBS, and BS-TBS. Funimation licensed the series and streamed it on its website in North America and the British Isles, in Europe through Wakanim, and in Australia and New Zealand through AnimeLab. Following Sony's acquisition of Crunchyroll, the series was moved to Crunchyroll.

Notes

References

External links
 

2021 anime television series debuts
Animeism
Crunchyroll anime
GoHands
Kodansha manga
Muse Communication
Shōnen manga